Brazen may refer to:

 Made of brass
 HMS Brazen, various ships of the British Royal Navy
 Brazen class destroyer, consisting of four Royal Navy destroyers
 Brazen (TV series), a British television show
 "Brazen (Weep)", a song by Skunk Anansie
 Captain Brazen, one of two main characters in the 1706 play The Recruiting Officer
 Brazen (film), an adaptation of the Nora Roberts novel Brazen Virtue

See also